David Solomon Halpern  (born June 1966) is a British civil servant, heading the Behavioural Insights Team (unofficially known as the Nudge Unit) spun out from the Cabinet Office.

Education 
Halpern attended King's School, Rochester, before attending Christ's College, University of Cambridge achieving a 1st in natural Sciences specialising in experimental psychology. He then went on to complete a PhD in social and political sciences, also at St John's College, Cambridge.

Career 
Halpern was a research fellow at the Policy Studies Institute (1991–94), a Nuffield College, Oxford prize research fellow (1993–96) and a lecturer in social human sciences at the University of Cambridge (1996–2001).

From 2001 to 2007 Halpern was chief analyst in the Prime Minister's Strategy Unit. He was then director of the Institute for Government from 2008 to 2010, where he remains a senior fellow.

Since October 2010 Halpern has been director of the Behavioural Insights Team, initially as part of the Cabinet Office and since 2013, as a partially privatised venture.

He currently is a visiting professor at King's College London.

He is one of the 56 individuals named by the UK government as contributing to the Scientific Advisory Group for Emergencies in response to the COVID-19 pandemic in the United Kingdom, focusing on behavioural changes such as increased handwashing. On 11 March 2020 he gave an interview to the BBC on the importance of shielding vulnerable people during the COVID-19 pandemic until herd immunity had been achieved.

Honours 
In 2016, Halpern was elected a Fellow of the Academy of Social Sciences (FAcSS).

He was appointed Commander of the Order of the British Empire (CBE) in the 2023 New Year Honours for public service.

Selected works 
He has authored or co-authored four books as well as a number of reports:
 Social Capital (2005).
 Options for Britain (1996 and 2010).
 The Hidden Wealth of Nations (2010).
 Inside the Nudge Unit (2015) 
 The MINDSPACE report (Influencing behaviour through public policy), co-author.

References 

Civil servants in the Cabinet Office
Behavioral economists
British psychologists
Alumni of Christ's College, Cambridge
Alumni of St John's College, Cambridge
Living people
Date of birth missing (living people)
Place of birth missing (living people)
Fellows of the Academy of Social Sciences
1966 births
Academics of the University of Cambridge
Commanders of the Order of the British Empire